Bedenec is a village located in the northern Varaždin County region of Croatia, with the village being approximately 10km from the Slovenian border.  

Populated places in Varaždin County